Hananiah ben Sanballat was hereditary governor of Samaria under the Achaemenid Empire. He reigned during the mid fourth century BCE. He was the son of Sanballat II and is mentioned in the Elephantine papyri.

References

Frank Moore Cross, Jr. "Aspects of Samaritan and Jewish History in Late Persian and Hellenistic Times." The Harvard Theological Review, Vol. 59, No. 3 (Jul., 1966), pp. 201-211.
Frank Moore Cross Jr. "The Discovery of the Samaria Papyri." The Biblical Archaeologist, Vol. 26, No. 4 (Dec., 1963), pp. 109-121.

Ancient Samaritan people